Koksan County is a county in North Hwanghae Province, North Korea.

Administrative divisions
Koksan county is divided into 1 ŭp (town) and 20 ri (villages):

References

Counties of North Hwanghae